The repeating crossbow, also known as the repeater crossbow, and the Zhuge crossbow (also romanized Chu-ko-nu) due to its association with the Three Kingdoms-era strategist Zhuge Liang (181–234 AD), is a crossbow invented during the Warring States period in China that combined the bow spanning, bolt placing, and shooting actions into one motion.

The earliest archaeological evidence of the repeating crossbow is found in the state of Chu, but it uses a pistol grip that is different from the later and more commonly known Ming dynasty design.

Although the repeating crossbow was in use throughout most of Chinese history until the late Qing dynasty, it was generally regarded as a non-military weapon suited for women, defending households against robbers, and even hunting.

History 

According to the Wu-Yue Chunqiu (history of the Wu-Yue War), written in the Eastern Han dynasty, the repeating crossbow was invented during the Warring States Period by a Mr. Qin from the State of Chu. This is corroborated by the earliest archaeological evidence of repeating crossbows, which was excavated from a Chu burial site at Tomb 47 at Qinjiazui, Hubei Province, and has been dated to the 4th century BC, during the Warring States Period (475 - 220 BC). Unlike repeating crossbows of later eras, the ancient double-shot repeating crossbow uses a pistol grip and a rear-pulling mechanism for arming. The Ming repeating crossbow uses an arming mechanism that requires its user to push a rear lever upwards and downwards back and forth. Although handheld repeating crossbows were generally weak and required additional poison, probably aconite, for lethality, much larger mounted versions appeared during the Ming dynasty.

In 180 AD, Yang Xuan used a type of repeating crossbow powered by the movement of wheels:

The invention of the repeating crossbow has often been attributed to Zhuge Liang, but he in fact had nothing to do with it. This misconception is based on a record attributing improvements to the multiple bolt crossbows to him.

During the Ming dynasty, repeating crossbows were used on ships.

Although the repeating crossbow has been used throughout Chinese history and is attested as late as 19th century Qing dynasty in battle against the Japanese, it was generally not regarded as an important military weapon. The Wubei Zhi, written during the 17th century, says that it was favored by people in the southeast but lacked in strength and its bolts tended not to harm anyone. The functions of the repeating crossbow listed in the text are primarily non-military: tiger hunting, defending fortified houses, and usage by timid men and women. According to the Tiangong Kaiwu, also written during the 17th century, the repeating crossbow is only useful against robbers.

Designs 
 

The repeating crossbow combined the actions of spanning the bow, placing the bolt, and shooting into a one-handed movement, thus allowing for a much higher rate of fire than a normal crossbow. The most common repeating crossbow design originated from the Ming Dynasty and consisted of a top-mounted magazine containing a reservoir of bolts which fed the crossbow using gravity, a rectangular lever attached to both the tiller and the magazine, and a tiller mounting the prods with a stock. By holding the tiller firmly against the hip while pushing and pulling the lever forwards and backwards, the user was able to catch the drawstring on to side notches at the back of the magazine while loading the bolt. A sliding lug nut at the back of the magazine pushed the drawstring out of the notches once the lever is fully pulled backwards; with the tiller pushing the nut up and enabling the drawstring to propel the loaded bolt. The Korean version mounted the magazine at the end of a longer stalk as well as a pivoting recurve bow as a prod; increasing the drawspan, range, and performance of the crossbow. Additionally, both the Ming Dynasty in China and the Joseon Dynasty in Korea developed variations that either shot two to three bolts per draw or fired pellets in place of bolts.

An earlier version originated from the State of Chu during the Warring States period and used a different design. It consisted of a tiller mounting a fixed double magazine on top as well as a pistol style grip at the bottom beneath the prods mount. Instead of an overhand lever for arming and shooting, it used a sliding lever that had a handle tied to the end with chord. The lever was pumped forwards and backwards with one hand while the user held the pistol grip firm with the other hand; in a manner similar to drawing a regular bow. Within the crossbow, the lever was embedded with a special metal trigger composed of a latch and sear; the entire trigger being shaped like a crab's claw arm. Upon pushing the lever forward, the trigger was moved forward to catch the drawstring and becomes locked firm by friction and tensional forces from grooves inside the mounting lever and sear. Upon being drawn back, the draw string is spanned while the double magazine fed two bolts onto the firing slots on either side of the trigger once the drawstring is almost fully drawn. At the very end of the pulling action, the sear comes in contact with a round bar that holds the sliding lever in place. The bar pushed the sear forward to release the trigger and enable the drawstring to propel the two loaded bolts. Ultimately, it was superseded by the aforementioned design from the Ming Dynasty due to being overtly complex with weaker performance.

Utility 

The basic construction of the repeating crossbow has remained very much unchanged since its invention, making it one of the longest-lived mechanical weapons. The bolts of one magazine are fired and reloaded by simply pushing and pulling the lever back and forth. 

The repeating crossbow had an effective range of 70 meters and a maximum range of 180 meters. Its comparatively short range limited its usage to primarily defensive positions, where its ability to rapidly discharge 7–10 bolts in 15–20 seconds was used to prevent assaults on gates and doorways. In comparison, an arbalest could only deliver about two bolts a minute. The repeating crossbow, with its smaller and lighter ammunition, had neither the power nor the accuracy of an arbalest. Thus, it was not very useful against more heavily armoured troops unless poison was smeared on bolts, in which case even a small wound might prove fatal.

See also 

 Cheiroballistra
 Polybolos
 Rapid fire crossbow
 Panjagan

Notes

References

Bibliography 

 
 
 
 .
 
 
 .
 
 .
 
 
 .
 
 .
 .
 .
 
 
 .
 Hadden, R. Lee. 2005. "Confederate Boys and Peter Monkeys." Armchair General. January 2005. Adapted from a talk given to the Geological Society of America on March 25, 2004.
 
 .
 .
 
 .
 .
 
 
 
 .
 

 
 
 
 
 .
 

 
 .
 
 
 .
 .
 
 .
 .
 
 .
 
 
 
 
 
 Schmidtchen, Volker (1977a), "Riesengeschütze des 15. Jahrhunderts. Technische Höchstleistungen ihrer Zeit", Technikgeschichte 44 (2): 153–173 (153–157)
 Schmidtchen, Volker (1977b), "Riesengeschütze des 15. Jahrhunderts. Technische Höchstleistungen ihrer Zeit", Technikgeschichte 44 (3): 213–237 (226–228)
 .
 
 
 
 .

External links 

 Build a Wooden Crossbow Popular Mechanics Plans

Crossbows
Chinese inventions
Weapons of China